WKDK (1240 AM) is a radio station broadcasting a variety format and licensed to Newberry, South Carolina, United States.  The station is currently owned by Newberry Broadcasting Company, Inc. and features programming from ABC Radio.

References

External links
WKDK website

KDK